Plays Tangerine Dream is the ninety-sixth release and second compilation by the German electronic music group Tangerine Dream. It features re-recordings and remixes by several present and past members of the band.

Track listing

Personnel
 Edgar Froese
 Thorsten Quaeschning
 Linda Spa
 Paul Haslinger
 Zlatko Perica
 Johannes Schmoelling
 Ralf Wadephul

References

2006 albums
Tangerine Dream albums